The 2014 Fukuoka International Women's Cup was a professional tennis tournament played on outdoor grass courts. It was the fourteenth edition of the tournament and part of the 2014 ITF Women's Circuit, offering a total of $50,000 in prize money. It took place in Fukuoka, Japan, on 5–11 May 2014.

Singles main draw entrants

Seeds 

 1 Rankings as of 28 April 2014

Other entrants 
The following players received wildcards into the singles main draw:
  Miyu Kato
  Naomi Osaka
  Riko Sawayanagi
  Tamarine Tanasugarn

The following players received entry from the qualifying draw:
  Monique Adamczak
  Miyabi Inoue
  Ana Veselinović
  Yuuki Tanaka

The following player received entry by a lucky loser spot:
  Tori Kinard

Champions

Singles 

  Naomi Broady def.  Kristýna Plíšková 5–7, 6–3, 6–4

Doubles 

  Shuko Aoyama /  Eri Hozumi def.  Naomi Broady /  Eleni Daniilidou 6–3, 6–4

External links 
 2014 Fukuoka International Women's Cup at ITFtennis.com
 Official website 

2014 ITF Women's Circuit
2014
2014 in Japanese women's sport
May 2014 sports events in Japan
2014 in Japanese tennis